Cottage Grove is a city in Lane County, Oregon, United States. Its population was 10,643 at the 2020 census. It is the third largest city in Lane County. It is on Interstate 5, Oregon Route 99, and the main Willamette Valley line of the CORP railroad.

History
Cottage Grove is located on the lands of the Kiikaapoi (Kickapoo), Caddo, and Wichita nations of Native Americans.

Cottage Grove post office was established in 1855 east of present-day Creswell. It was named by its first postmaster, G. C. Pearce, whose home was in an oak grove. In 1861, the office was moved to the present site of Saginaw; then in the late 1860s, to the southwestern-most part of present-day Cottage Grove, on the west bank of the Coast Fork Willamette River. When the Southern Pacific railroad was built through the area in the 1870s, Cottage Grove station was placed more than half a mile northeast of the post office, on the river's east side. This was the start of a neighborhood dispute that lasted for nearly 20 years. The people living near the post office did not want it moved to the railroad station, so a new office was established at the station with the name Lemati, a Chinook Jargon word that means "mountain". Lemati office ran from November 1893 to September 1894, but in March 1898 the Cottage Grove office was renamed Lemati, and ran that way until it was permanently renamed Cottage Grove in May 1898.

The only existing covered railroad bridge west of the Mississippi River, the National Register of Historic Places-listed Chambers Railroad Bridge, is in Cottage Grove.  The city restored it in 2011, reopening it on December 3.

Cottage Grove received the All-America City Award by the National Civic League in 1968 and 2004.  It has been recognized as a Tree City USA by The Arbor Day Foundation for over a decade. In October 2008, it was the 17th city in the United States to be recognized as a Green Power Community.

Lemati
Cottage Grove was incorporated in 1887, but the people on its east side rebelled in 1893 and founded East Cottage Grove. The Oregon State Legislature changed its name to Lemati in 1895; the train station's signboard said "Cottage Grove", and "Lemati" in smaller letters. In 1899 an act was passed that consolidated the two towns as Cottage Grove.

Geography

Cottage Grove lies south of the confluence of the Row River and the Coast Fork of the Willamette River. This confluence effectively marks the southern end of the Willamette Valley.

Climate
This region experiences warm (but not hot) and dry summers, with no average monthly temperatures above .  According to the Köppen Climate Classification system, Cottage Grove has a warm-summer Mediterranean climate, abbreviated "Csb" on climate maps.

Demographics

2010 census
As of the census of 2010, there were 9,686 people, 3,895 households, and 2,469 families living in the city. The racial makeup of the city was 90.4% White, 0.3% African American, 1.3% Native American, 1.1% Asian, 0.1% Pacific Islander, 3.1% from other races, and 3.8% from two or more races. Hispanic or Latino of any race were 8.0% of the population.

There were 3,895 households, of which 32.2% had children under the age of 18 living with them, 43.8% were married couples living together, 14.8% had a female householder with no husband present, 4.9% had a male householder with no wife present, and 36.6% were non-families. 29.9% of all households were made up of individuals, and 14.1% had someone living alone who was 65 years of age or older. The average household size was 2.47 and the average family size was 3.02.

The median age in the city was 38.3 years. 24.4% of residents were under the age of 18; 8.5% were between the ages of 18 and 24; 25.1% were from 25 to 44; 25.3% were from 45 to 64; and 16.5% were 65 years of age or older. The gender makeup of the city was 48.0% male and 52.0% female.

2000 census
As of the census of 2000, there were 8,445 people, 3,264 households, and 2,183 families living in the city. The population density was 2,561.6 people per square mile (988.1/km). There were 3,430 housing units at an average density of 1,040.4 per square mile (401.3/km). The racial makeup of the city was 92.84% White, 0.15% African American, 1.21% Native American, 0.92% Asian, 0.09% Pacific Islander, 1.55% from other races, and 3.23% from two or more races. Hispanic or Latino of any race were 4.94% of the population. There were 3,264 households, out of which 33.0% had children under the age of 18 living with them, 49.4% were married couples living together, 13.2% had a female householder with no husband present, and 33.1% were non-families. 28.1% of all households were made up of individuals, and 14.3% had someone living alone who was 65 years of age or older. The average household size was 2.54 and the average family size was 3.05.

In the city, the population dispersal was 27.4% under the age of 18, 8.5% from 18 to 24, 26.4% from 25 to 44, 21.7% from 45 to 64, and 16.0% who were 65 years of age or older. The median age was 37 years. For every 100 females, there were 92.1 males. For every 100 females age 18 and over, there were 86.5 males.  The median income for a household in the city was $30,442, and the median income for a family was $37,457. Males had a median income of $30,775 versus $23,485 for females. The per capita income for the city was $14,550. About 15.6% of families and 19.8% of the population were below the poverty line, including 29.0% of those under age 18 and 13.0% of those age 65 or over.

Arts and culture

Annual cultural events
The largest festivals in Cottage Grove are Bohemia Mining Days (third weekend in July) and the Western Oregon Exposition Heritage Fair (third weekend in August).

Museums and other points of interest
Cottage Grove is known as the "Covered Bridge Capital of The West" with six covered bridges near the city. Five of the six bridges, Chambers Covered Bridge, Currin Bridge, Dorena Bridge, Mosby Creek Bridge, and Stewart Bridge, are listed on the National Register of Historic Places. Centennial Covered Bridge is a replica bridge constructed from materials salvaged from dismantled bridges. The Swinging Bridge is a historic suspension footbridge.

It is home to 21 murals throughout downtown reflecting the community's history.  

The Cottage Theatre and the Opal Center for Arts and Education offer excellent live theatre productions year-round.

Cottage Grove has four museums:

 The Cottage Grove Historical Museum, filled with vintage photographs and artifacts, including a coat worn by a survivor of the RMS Titanic 1912 shipwreck
 The Bohemia Gold Mining Museum, illustrating the area's gold mining history in the nearby Bohemia Mining District
 The Oregon Aviation History Center, preserving Oregon's rich aviation history, including some vintage aircraft restoration projects.
 The Dr. Snapp House, with artifacts of early medical practices; built in 1886 by one of the community's first doctors, the Queen Anne-style home is owned and maintained by the Prospectors and Gold Diggers Club.

Film location

Several films have been filmed in Cottage Grove:
 Buster Keaton's The General (1926) in town and the surrounding countryside; it included a spectacular locomotive crash, and the wrecked train was a minor tourist attraction until it was dismantled for scrap during World War II
 Emperor of the North Pole (1973)
 Parts of Animal House (1978);  its 25th-anniversary release was celebrated by the citizens with a toga party on August 30, 2003, on Main Street, where the movie's climactic parade sequence was filmed
 (1986) Portions Stand By Me, along the railroad tracks east of town (now the Row River National Recreation Trail, a bicycle and walking trail)
 Ricochet River (1997) starring Kate Hudson

Sports
Cottage Grove has two golf courses. Middlefield is owned and operated by the City of Cottage Grove. It is a challenging 18-hole executive course surrounded by mature landscaping and next to Interstate 5. Middlefield also has a disc golf course. Hidden Valley is a privately-owned 10-hole course nestled along the northern slope of Mount David featuring numerous gigantic oak trees and bounded by Bennett Creek and the Coast Fork of the Willamette River. Coiner Park offers tennis, pickleball and basketball courts. South Lane School District has a newly renovated aquatic center and its high school athletic facilities are often used for regional and state athletic events.

Parks and recreation
Dorena Lake and Cottage Grove Lake are near the city and offer picnicking, camping and boating facilities. The Row River National Recreation Trail is a 14-mile, paved, multi-use trail that begins in Cottage Grove's Historic Downtown District and follows the route of the now-abandoned Oregon Pacific & Eastern Railroad line, along the scenic shores of the Row (rhymes with 'cow') River and Dorena Reservoir. Rental bicycles are available near Trailhead Park.

Education
The South Lane School District serves Cottage Grove and the surrounding area. Cottage Grove High School, Al Kennedy High School, Lincoln Middle School, Bohemia and Harrison elementary schools and the Academy for Character Education are in the city. Dorena School (K-8) and the Child's Way Charter School (5-12) are rural schools located in the Row River Valley east of Cottage Grove. London School (K-8) is a rural school located south of Cottage Grove Lake.  Lane Community College has a Cottage Grove satellite campus offering credit and enrichment courses.

Media
Since 1909, the Cottage Grove Sentinel (circulation of 3,331) is the city's weekly newspaper. KNND is its local radio station.

Infrastructure

Transportation

Air
Jim Wright Field is a public airport serving small general aviation aircraft, located one mile (1.6 km) east of Cottage Grove.

Bus
Lane Transit District runs bus service to nearby Eugene and Springfield. South Lane Wheels offers a shuttle and door-to-door service in Cottage Grove.

Notable people
 Dennis Dunaway
 Diane Downs 
 Dyrol Burleson
 Everett W. Holstrom
Richard Swift
 Opal Whiteley
 Tulku Jigme Thrinley Rinpoche (notable Buddhist teacher in the Vajrayana tradition)

See also
 List of Oregon covered bridges

References

External links

 Entry for Cottage Grove in the Oregon Blue Book
Cottage Grove in the Oral History Archive

 
Willamette Valley
Cities in Oregon
Cities in Lane County, Oregon
1855 establishments in Oregon Territory
Populated places on the Willamette River
Populated places established in 1855
Railway towns in Oregon